Wuchang District (武昌区) is a former city, now a central district of Wuhan, Hubei, China.

Wuchang may also refer to:
Wuchang (烏萇國, Uddiyana), an ancient kingdom in northern Pakistan
Wuchang, Heilongjiang (五常市), a county-level city in Heilongjiang, China
Wuchang, Sichuan (吴场镇), a town in Jiajiang County, Sichuan, China
Wuchang Subdistrict (五常街道), a subdistrict in Yuhang District, Hangzhou, Zhejiang, China
Heibai Wuchang (黑白无常), or Black and White Wuchang, deity pair in Chinese folk religion
Five Constants or Wuchang (五常), cardinal ethical principles in Confucianism
Ezhou, once known as Wuchang County

See also
Wuchang station (disambiguation)

Wucheng (disambiguation)